First-seeded Doris Hart defeated Nancye Bolton 6–3, 6–4 in the final to win the women's singles tennis title at the 1949 Australian Championships.

Seeds
The seeded players are listed below. Doris Hart is the champion; others show the round in which they were eliminated.

 Doris Hart (champion)
 Nancye Bolton (finalist)
 Thelma Long (semifinals)
 Joyce Fitch (second round)
 Mary Hawton (quarterfinals)
 Sadie Newcombe (quarterfinals)
 Esme Ashford (second round)
 Dulcie Whittaker (quarterfinals)

Draw

Key
 Q = Qualifier
 WC = Wild card
 LL = Lucky loser
 r = Retired

Finals

Earlier rounds

Section 1

Section 2

External links
 

1949 in women's tennis
1949
1949 in Australian tennis
1949 in Australian women's sport